Cook the Books was a New Zealand cooking show. It is based on the Cook the Books bookstore that focuses on NZ chefs who have released their own cookbooks and to cook from them. The show is hosted by Carly Flynn, and aired its first season on Choice TV on 30 October 2014 along with a second season in 2015.

Episodes

References

2014 New Zealand television series debuts
New Zealand cooking television series
Choice TV original programming